The Men's sprint competition at the Biathlon World Championships 2021 was held on 12 February 2021 at 14:30 local time.

Results

References

Men's sprint